In Euclidean geometry, the intersection of a line and a line can be the empty set, a point, or another line. Distinguishing these cases and finding the intersection have uses, for example, in computer graphics, motion planning, and collision detection.

In three-dimensional Euclidean geometry, if two lines are not in the same plane, they have no point of intersection and are called skew lines. If they are in the same plane, however, there are three possibilities: if they coincide (are not distinct lines), they have an infinitude of points in common (namely all of the points on either of them); if they are distinct but have the same slope, they are said to be parallel and have no points in common; otherwise, they have a single point of intersection.

The distinguishing features of non-Euclidean geometry are the number and locations of possible intersections between two lines and the number of possible lines with no intersections (parallel lines) with a given line.

Formulas 

A necessary condition for two lines to intersect is that they are in the same plane—that is, are not skew lines. Satisfaction of this condition is equivalent to the tetrahedron with vertices at two of the points on one line and two of the points on the other line being degenerate in the sense of having zero volume. For the algebraic form of this condition, see .

Given two points on each line

The intersection  of line  and  can be defined using determinants.

The determinants can be written out as:

 

When the two lines are parallel or coincident, the denominator is zero.

Given two points on each line segment

Note that the intersection point above is for the infinitely long lines defined by the points, rather than the line segments between the points, and can produce an intersection point not contained in either of the two line segments.

 

 
and
 
with
 

The intersection point falls within the first line segment if , and it falls within the second line segment if . These inequalities can be tested without the need for division, allowing rapid determination of the existence of any line segment intersection before calculating its exact point.

Given two line equations
The  and  coordinates of the point of intersection of two non-vertical lines can easily be found using the following substitutions and rearrangements.

At the point where the two lines intersect (if they do), both  coordinates will be the same, hence the following equality:

and so, 

To find the  coordinate, all we need to do is substitute the value of  into either one of the two line equations, for example, into the first:

Hence, the point of intersection is 

Note if  then the two lines are parallel. If  as well, the lines are different and there is no intersection, otherwise the two lines are identical and intersect at every point.

Using homogeneous coordinates  

By using homogeneous coordinates, the intersection point of two implicitly defined lines can be determined quite easily. In 2D, every point can be defined as a projection of a 3D point, given as the ordered triple .

The intersection  of two lines is then simply given by

If , the lines do not intersect.

More than two lines 

The intersection of two lines can be generalized to involve additional lines. The existence of and expression for the -line intersection problem are as follows.

In two dimensions 

In two dimensions, more than two lines almost certainly do not intersect at a single point. To determine if they do and, if so, to find the intersection point, write the th equation as

and stack these equations into matrix form as

If  has independent columns, its rank is 2. Then if and only if the rank of the augmented matrix  is also 2, there exists a solution of the matrix equation and thus an intersection point of the  lines. The intersection point, if it exists, is given by

Alternatively, the solution can be found by jointly solving any two independent equations.

In three dimensions 

The above approach can be readily extended to three dimensions. In three or more dimensions, even two lines almost certainly do not intersect; pairs of non-parallel lines that do not intersect are called skew lines.  But if an intersection does exist it can be found, as follows.

In three dimensions a line is represented by the intersection of two planes, each of which has an equation of the form

Thus a set of  lines can be represented by  equations in the 3-dimensional coordinate vector :

As before there is a unique intersection point if and only if  has full column rank and the augmented matrix  does not, and the unique intersection if it exists is given by

Nearest points to skew lines

In two or more dimensions, we can usually find a point that is mutually closest to two or more lines in a least-squares sense.

In two dimensions

In the two-dimensional case, first, represent line  as a point  on the line and a unit normal vector , perpendicular to that line.

which is the unit vector along the line, rotated by a right angle.

Note that the distance from a point  to the line  is given by

And so the squared distance from a point  to a line is

The sum of squared distances to many lines is the cost function:

This can be rearranged:

so

and so

In more than two dimensions

In any number of dimensions, if  is a unit vector along the th line, then

  becomes 

where  is the identity matrix, and so

General derivation
In order to find the intersection point of a set of lines, we calculate the point with minimum distance to them. Each line is defined by an origin  and a unit direction vector . The square of the distance from a point  to one of the lines is given from Pythagoras:

 
The sum of distances to the square to all lines is

 

 

 

which results in

 

where  is the identity matrix.

Non-Euclidean geometry 

In spherical geometry, any two lines intersect.

In hyperbolic geometry, given any line and any point, there are infinitely many lines through that point that do not intersect the given line.

See also
Line segment intersection
Line intersection in projective space
Distance between two parallel lines
Distance from a point to a line
Line–plane intersection
Parallel postulate
Triangulation (computer vision)

References

External links 
 Distance between Lines and Segments with their Closest Point of Approach, applicable to two, three, or more dimensions.

Euclidean geometry
Linear algebra
Geometric algorithms
Geometric intersection